The 1986 Chicago White Sox season was the 87th season for the Chicago White Sox franchise of Major League Baseball (MLB). They compiled a record of 72–90, finishing in fifth place in the West division of the American League, 20 games behind the first-place California Angels. The team played their home games at Comiskey Park.

Offseason 
November 25, 1985: Wayne Tolleson was traded by the Texas Rangers with Dave Schmidt to the Chicago White Sox for a player to be named later, Ed Correa, and Scott Fletcher. The Chicago White Sox sent Jose Mota (December 11, 1985) to the Texas Rangers to complete the trade.
December 10, 1985: Bobby Bonilla was drafted by the Chicago White Sox from the Pittsburgh Pirates in the 1985 rule 5 draft.
December 12, 1985: Ron Hassey was traded by the New York Yankees with Joe Cowley to the Chicago White Sox for Britt Burns, Glen Braxton (minors), and Mike Soper (minors).
February 13, 1986: Ron Hassey was traded by the Chicago White Sox with Chris Alvarez (minors), Eric Schmidt (minors), and Matt Winters to the New York Yankees for Neil Allen, Scott Bradley, Glen Braxton (minors), and cash.

Regular season 
In a game against the Minnesota Twins held on October 4, Greg Gagne of the Twins hit two inside the park home runs in one game.

Season standings

Record vs. opponents

Notable transactions 
 June 29, 1986: Steve Lyons was traded by the Boston Red Sox to the Chicago White Sox for Tom Seaver.
July 23, 1986: Bobby Bonilla was traded by the Chicago White Sox to the Pittsburgh Pirates for José DeLeón.
 July 30, 1986: Ron Hassey was traded by the New York Yankees with a player to be named later and Carlos Martinez to the Chicago White Sox for Ron Kittle, Wayne Tolleson, and Joel Skinner. The New York Yankees sent Bill Lindsey (December 24, 1986) to the Chicago White Sox to complete the trade.
 August 12, 1986: Steve Carlton signed as a free agent with the Chicago White Sox.
August 15, 1986: George Foster was signed as a free agent with the Chicago White Sox.
August 13, 1986: Craig Grebeck was signed by the Chicago White Sox as an amateur free agent.
September 7, 1986: George Foster was released by the Chicago White Sox.

1986 Opening Day lineup 
 John Cangelosi, CF
 Wayne Tolleson, 3B
 Harold Baines, RF
 Carlton Fisk, LF
 Ron Kittle, DH
 Greg Walker, 1B
 Tim Hulett, 2B
 Joel Skinner, C
 Ozzie Guillén, SS
 Tom Seaver, P

Roster

Player stats

Batting 
Note: G = Games played; AB = At bats; R = Runs scored; H = Hits; 2B = Doubles; 3B = Triples; HR = Home runs; RBI = Runs batted in; BB = Base on balls; SO = Strikeouts; AVG = Batting average; SB = Stolen bases

Pitching 
Note: W = Wins; L = Losses; ERA = Earned run average; G = Games pitched; GS = Games started; SV = Saves; IP = Innings pitched; H = Hits allowed; R = Runs allowed; ER = Earned runs allowed; HR = Home runs allowed; BB = Walks allowed; K = Strikeouts

Farm system

Notes

References

External links 
1986 Chicago White Sox at Baseball Reference

Chicago White Sox seasons
Chicago White Sox season
Chicago